Paramount Home Entertainment (formerly Paramount Home Media Distribution, and originally Paramount Home Video) is the home video distribution arm of Paramount Pictures.

The division oversees Paramount Global's home entertainment and transactional digital distribution activities worldwide. The division is responsible for the sales, marketing and distribution of home entertainment content on behalf of Paramount Pictures, Paramount Players, Paramount Animation, Paramount Television Studios, CBS, Paramount Media Networks (Showtime, MTV, Nickelodeon, VH1, BET, and Comedy Central), Paramount+, and applicable licensing and servicing of certain pre-2010 DreamWorks Pictures, Miramax, pre-2005 Dimension Films titles, and DreamWorks Animation films from 2006 to 2012, as well as select IFC Films titles and Saban Films titles. PHE additionally manages global licensing of studio content and transactional distribution across worldwide digital distribution platforms including online, mobile and portable devices and emerging technologies.

History 
Before Paramount Home Entertainment was formed, Paramount released its video library through Fotomat. The relationship ended and Paramount soon formed its own video arm in 1979.

In the UK and other countries, the Paramount Pictures film library were released on VHS by CIC Video alongside Universal Pictures until 1999 before CIC Video was renamed to Paramount Home Entertainment UK and PolyGram Video was renamed to Universal Pictures Home Entertainment UK.

In 2008, PHE launched a direct-to-video label, Paramount Famous Productions (with the "Famous" part of the name a throwback to the days when the company was called Famous Players).

In 2011, due to a company restructure, PHE was renamed Paramount Home Media Distribution.

In May 2019, PHMD reverted its name back to Paramount Home Entertainment, which is the name they carried from 1999 to 2011.

HD DVD and Blu-ray support 
Paramount brands the majority of its HD content under the label 'Paramount High Definition' which is seen both on the title box cover and as an in-movie opening. Films from Paramount subsidiaries such as Nickelodeon Movies and MTV Films as well as from former sister studio DreamWorks use no special branding, Paramount Vantage (another subsidiary) releases only select titles under the Paramount High Definition banner.

In October 2005, Paramount announced that it would be supporting the HD video format Blu-ray in addition to rival format HD DVD, becoming the first studio to release on both formats. Its first four HD DVD releases came in July 2006, and it released four titles on Blu-ray two months later. In August 2007, Paramount (along with DreamWorks and DreamWorks Animation) announced their exclusive support for HD DVD. However, when other studios eventually dropped HD DVD and players for the technology stopped being manufactured, Paramount switched to Blu-ray. In May 2008, it released three titles on Blu-ray and continues to release its high-definition discs in that format exclusively.

Sub-labels

Paramount Famous Productions

Paramount Famous Productions was a sub-label of PHE, handling films released exclusively to home video formats without a theatrical release. The label was closed in 2011.

Paramount DVD
Paramount DVD is a sub-label of PHE exclusively found on DVD releases, generally noted by a logo animation with a DVD flying into the Paramount mountain and taking the shape of the outline created by the mountain.

Paramount High Definition
Paramount High Definition is a sub-label focusing on home media releases of Paramount's film and television library in high definition video formats.

Peanuts Home Video
Peanuts Home Video  was a sub-label used under license from United Feature Syndicate to distribute episodes of The Charlie Brown and Snoopy Show and Peanuts specials, including Snoopy! The Musical, It Was My Best Birthday Ever, Charlie Brown and the then-annually-repeated specials Be My Valentine, Charlie Brown, It's the Easter Beagle, Charlie Brown, It's the Great Pumpkin, Charlie Brown, A Charlie Brown Thanksgiving, A Charlie Brown Christmas and Happy New Year, Charlie Brown. It was active from 1994 to 2003.

References 

American companies established in 1976
Home video companies of the United States
Home video distributors
Paramount Pictures
Paramount Global subsidiaries
Entertainment companies based in California
Companies based in Los Angeles
Entertainment companies established in 1976
Mass media companies established in 1976
1976 establishments in California